Irfan Makki (born October 30, 1975) is a Pakistani Canadian Muslim singer-songwriter.

Career
After signing with Awakening Records, he released the album I Believe, with 13 tracks. The title track "I Believe", featuring the Swedish-Lebanese musician Maher Zain, was released as a single accompanied by an official music video.

Discography
Albums

Videography
2011: "I Believe" (feat. Maher Zain)

References

External links

Living people
Canadian Muslims
Pakistani Muslims
Pakistani emigrants to Canada
Naturalized citizens of Canada
Canadian singer-songwriters
Performers of Islamic music
Awakening Music artists
1975 births
21st-century Canadian male singers
Rotana Records artists
Canadian male singer-songwriters